Natural Product Updates (NPU) provides graphical abstracts of new developments in natural product chemistry, selected from dozens of key primary journals. Coverage includes:
Isolation studies
Biosynthesis
New natural products
Known compounds from new sources
Structure determinations
New properties and biological activities

Natural Product Updates is a fully searchable online, text and graphical database that is updated weekly with the latest developments in catalysis. It is also available as a monthly print bulletin.

External links
 NPU homepage
 RSC Publishing homepage

Chemistry journals
Royal Society of Chemistry academic journals